Reckless Abandon is a folk rock album by US musician David Bromberg. His sixth album, it was released by Fantasy Records as a vinyl LP in 1977. It was released by Fantasy on CD in 1998, combined with Bromberg's subsequent album, Bandit in a Bathing Suit.

The panel cartoon album cover was drawn by B. Kliban.

Critical reception

On Allmusic, William Ruhlmann said, "By billing this album to the David Bromberg Band, Bromberg signals that the listener can expect to hear more than just his adenoidal voice and variety of acoustic instruments. But then, that just means it's as eclectic as most David Bromberg albums. The lead-off track "I Want to Go Home" has a blues-rock feel; horns wail into a Dixieland swarm during the old folk tune "Stealin'"; and then comes a medley of old-timey country tunes played on banjo, mandolin, and guitar. That's just the first three tracks..."

Audio magazine said, "Reckless Abandon demonstrates David's ever-growing confidence and improvement as vocalist and bandleader. Despite [some] flaws, this is still his best-recorded and best-played studio effort."

Track listing
Side one
"I Want to Go Home" (David Bromberg) – 3:06
"Stealin' (Gus Cannon) – 3:50
Medly – 3:03
"Sally Goodin" (Traditional, arranged by Bromberg)
"Old Joe Clark" (Traditional, arranged by Bromberg)
"Wheel Hoss" (Bill Monroe)
"Child's Song" (Murray McLauchlan) – 4:42
"Mrs. Delion's Lament" (Jim Ringer) – 4:28
Side two
Medly – 3:16
"Battle of Bull Run" (source Frank Warner, arranged by Bromberg)
"Paddy on the Turnpike" (Traditional, arranged by Dick Fegy)
"Rover's Fancy" (Traditional, arranged by Bromberg)
"What a Town" (Rick Danko, Bobby Charles) – 3:17
"Baby Breeze" (Bromberg, Hugh McDonald, Heard) – 3:01
"Beware, Brother Beware" (Morry Lasco, Dick Adams, Fleecie Moore) – 7:36
"Nobody's Fault but Mine" (Blind Willie Johnson) – 3:48

Personnel
David Bromberg Band
David Bromberg – guitar, electric guitar, slide guitar, dobro, mandolin, vocals
Dick Fegy – guitar, electric guitar, mandolin, banjo, violin
George Kindler – violin, mandolin
Curt Linberg – trombone
John Firmin – tenor saxophone, clarinet, piccolo, pennywhistle 
Hugh McDonald – bass, vocals
Lance Dickerson – drums, vocals
Additional musicians
Steve Madaio – trumpet
Chuck Findley – trumpet
Darrell Leonard – trumpet
Trevor Lawrence – tenor saxophone
Jim Price – trombone, vocals
Peggy Sandvig – piano
Steve Forman – percussion
Daniel Moore – vocals
Matthew Moore – vocals
Production
Produced by Jim Price
Music arranged by Jim Price and David Bromberg
Engineering: Joe Tuzen
Additional engineering: Steve Williams, Carla Frederick, Steve Barncard, Matt Hyde, Phil Kaffel, Skip Taylor
Mastering: John Golden
Cover art: B. Kliban
Art direction: Phil Carroll

References

David Bromberg albums
Fantasy Records albums
1977 albums